Maria Kirillovna of Russia (2 February 1907 – 25 October 1951) was the eldest daughter of Grand Duke Kirill Vladimirovich of Russia and Princess Victoria Melita of Edinburgh. She was born in Coburg when her parents were in exile because their marriage had not been approved by Tsar Nicholas II. She was generally called "Marie," the French version of her name, or by the Russian nickname "Masha". The family returned to Russia prior to World War I, but was forced to flee following the Russian Revolution of 1917.

Biography

Early life

Maria was raised in Coburg and in Saint-Briac, France. She was born Princess Maria Kirillovna of Russia, but her father granted her the title Grand Duchess of Russia with the style Imperial Highness when he declared himself Guardian of the Throne in 1921. As a child, the dark-haired, dark-eyed Maria took after her maternal grandmother, Grand Duchess Maria Alexandrovna of Russia, in appearance, with a wide, round face and a tendency to be overweight and to look older than her actual age when she was still a teenager. She was described as "shy and easy-going", but also had her share of mishaps. In 1921, when she was fifteen, the "flighty" Maria visited her aunt, Queen Marie of Romania, and carried on a flirtation with the son-in-law of a lady-in-waiting at the Romanian court. Her fifteen-year-old cousin, Princess Ileana of Romania, spread rumors about the flirtation when Maria returned home, resulting in strained relations between Marie of Romania and Maria's mother, Victoria. The conflict was eventually smoothed over.

Marriage and issue
The following year, on 24 February 1925, Maria was engaged to Karl, 6th Prince of Leiningen (13 February 1898 – 2 August 1946), and they were married on 25 November. Victoria was at her daughter's bedside when she gave birth to her first child, Emich Kirill, in 1926. She also attended the subsequent births of Maria's children. Maria had seven children in all, one of whom died in infancy during World War II. Her husband was forced to join the German army and was taken captive by the Soviets at the end of World War II. He died of starvation in a Russian concentration camp in 1946. Maria, left with little money, struggled to support her surviving six children. She died five years later of a heart attack at age forty-four.

Maria had seven children:
 Prince Emich Kirill Ferdinand Hermann of Leiningen (18 October 1926 – 30 October 1991); married Duchess Eilika of Oldenburg on 10 August 1950. They had four children. 
 Prince Karl Vladimir Ernst Heinrich of Leiningen (2 January 1928 – 28 September 1990) married Princess Marie Louise of Bulgaria on 20 February 1957 and they were divorced on 4 December 1968. They had two sons. 
 Princess Kira Melita Feodora Marie Victoria Alexandra of Leiningen (18 July 1930 – 24 September 2006) married Prince Andrew of Yugoslavia on 18 September 1963. They had three children. 
 Princess Margarita Ileana Victoria of Leiningen (9 May 1932 – 16 June 1994) married Frederick William, Prince of Hohenzollern  on 5 January 1951. They had three sons. 
 Princess Mechtilde Alexandra of Leiningen (2 January 1936 – 12 February 2021) married Karl Anton Bauscher on 25 November 1961. They had three sons.
 Prince Friedrich Wilhelm Berthold of Leiningen (18 June 1938 – 29 August 1999)
 Prince Peter Victor of Leiningen (23 December 1942 – 12 January 1943)

Ancestry

Notes

References
Michael John Sullivan, A Fatal Passion: The Story of the Uncrowned Last Empress of Russia, Random House, 1997, 
John Van der Kiste, Princess Victoria Melita, Sutton Publishing, 1991,

External links

Maria Kirillovna of Russia, Grand Duchess
1951 deaths
Princesses of royal blood (Russia)
Emigrants from the Russian Empire to Romania
Princesses of Leiningen
Leiningen family
People from Coburg
White Russian emigrants to Romania